Ernest of Austria  may refer to:

 Ernest, Margrave of Austria, ruled from 1055 to 1077
 Ernest, Duke of Austria, ruled from 1402 to 1424
 Archduke Ernest of Austria (1553–1595)